André Geourjon (born 25 August 1950) is a French biathlete. He competed in the 20 km individual event at the 1980 Winter Olympics.

References

1950 births
Living people
French male biathletes
Olympic biathletes of France
Biathletes at the 1980 Winter Olympics
Place of birth missing (living people)